KSquirrel is an image viewer for the KDE desktop environment with a disk navigator, file tree, thumbnails, extended thumbnails, dynamic format support, DCOP interface, KEXIF and KIPI plugins support. The current version is 0.8.0 (Dec 07 2007). KSquirrel is under the GPL-2.0-or-later license, and the KSquirrel-libs under the LPGL-2.0-or-later license and other licenses. It supports more than 57 image formats, including PNG, JPEG, PSD, APNG, GIF, WMF, OpenEXR and many other.

Current status
KSquirrel is abandoned by its original developer since 2008. The image codecs from KSquirrel have been rebranded in 2020 as a lightweight cross-platform image library called SAIL, under the MIT license.

However, KSquirrel is still maintained by the TDE team.

See also

Comparison of image viewers

References

External links
Official site

Free image viewers
Graphics software that uses Qt